Samuel Kingi Edwards was a Maori New Zealand former international representative rugby league footballer who played in the 1960s. 

He has two daughters: Naomi Cramer a Family Lawyer in Auckland, Marryna Edward and two sons Robert Edward and NZ born Morvin Edwards who later became a renowned rugby league player of his own right.

His mother was Ani Kingi from Torere affiliated to Ngai Tai. His father was Patrick Edwards of Whakatohea, Opotiki.
He had two full brothers: Patrick Edwards, Robert Edwards and two half brothers Jackie Edwards and John Edwards two half sisters Harriet Edwards and TeAorangi Haare.

Joseph Edwards former Auckland Blues player and rugby unions player is his great nephew.

While he played in Auckland, he was selected to play for the New Zealand national team as well as the New Zealand Māori team.

During the 1958 Auckland Rugby League season Edwards played for Marist. He played alongside Neville Denton. Edwards was selected to go on the 1965 New Zealand rugby league tour of Great Britain and France.

References 

Living people
Auckland rugby league team players
Bay of Plenty rugby league team players
Marist Saints players
New Zealand Māori rugby league team players
New Zealand national rugby league team players
New Zealand rugby league players
New Zealand sportsmen
Place of birth missing (living people)
Rugby league props
Year of birth missing (living people)